Charles Burton Robbins (November 6, 1877 – July 5, 1943) was a United States Army officer and United States Assistant Secretary of War from 1928 to 1929.

Biography
Robbins was born on November 6, 1877, in Hastings, Iowa. His family relocated to Lincoln, Nebraska, in 1893. Both of his parents died and Robbins went to a private school in Long Island, New York. He graduated from the University of Nebraska at Lincoln in 1898.

After graduating, Robbins enlisted into the United States Army to serve in the Spanish-American War. Fighting in the Battle of Marilao River on March 27, 1899, Robbins was wounded in action. He was commissioned as a lieutenant when he was sent to the Philippine-American War. After the war, Robbins enrolled at Columbia Law School and enlisted in the New York National Guard.

Robbins returned to Iowa in 1903 to practice insurance law. He also married Helen Larrabee, the daughter of Governor William Larrabee. In 1909, Governor Beryl F. Carroll appointed Robbins as a judge on the superior court of to the Cedar Rapids, Iowa. During World War I, he served as adjutant to Brigadier General Hubert Allison Allen at Camp Cody, New Mexico. Following the war, Robbins was promoted to major in the Army Reserves and then to colonel in the Officers Reserve Corps.

In January 1928, President Calvin Coolidge appointed Robbins as Assistant Secretary of War, succeeding Hanford MacNider. He submitted his resignation on March 5, 1929.

Robbins died on July 5, 1943, in Cedar Rapids. He was buried at Arlington National Cemetery in Arlington, Virginia.

References

1877 births
1943 deaths
United States Assistant Secretaries of War
United States Army soldiers
United States Army officers
American military personnel of the Spanish–American War
American military personnel of the Philippine–American War
United States Army personnel of World War I
Recipients of the Silver Star
Burials at Arlington National Cemetery
University of Nebraska–Lincoln alumni